Roda (Stork) is a chain of retail stores that began operating in 1994 by opening its first location in Kula. By developing a retail network of megamarkets, first in Vojvodina, and then throughout Serbia, Roda positioned itself as a store for large and family purchases.

History

In October 2006, Mercator Group from Slovenia bought 76% of shares of the M-Rodić company at 116 million euros and thus became the majority owner of Roda Markets. The process of the complete take-over of the company was completed in 2009, when Roda became a part of Mercator-S, and since April 2021 it has been an integral part of the Fortenova Group retail.

Retail network 
Under the slogan "Where the family is", Roda meets the needs of large family purchases. This brand has 33 stores throughout Serbia.

See also
 List of supermarket chains in Serbia

References

Serbian brands
Supermarkets of Serbia
Agrokor